General elections were held in Angola on 29 and 30 September 1992 to elect a President and National Assembly, the first time free and multi-party elections had been held in the country. They followed the signing of the Bicesse Accord on 31 May 1991 in an attempt to end the 17-year-long civil war. Voter turnout was 91.3% for the parliamentary election and 91.2% for the presidential election.

The ruling People's Movement for the Liberation of Angola (MPLA) won both elections; however eight opposition parties, in particular the National Union for the Total Independence of Angola (UNITA), rejected the results as rigged. An official observer wrote that there was little UN supervision, that 500,000 UNITA voters were disenfranchised and that there were 100 clandestine polling stations. UNITA sent negotiators to the capital, but at the same time prepared measures to resume the civil war. As a consequence, hostilities erupted in Luanda and immediately spread to other parts of the country. Several thousand to tens of thousands of UNITA members or supporters were killed nationwide by MPLA forces in a few days, in what is known as the Halloween Massacre.

Background
Angola was a colony of Portugal for more than 400 years from the 15th century. Demands for independence picked up momentum during the early 1950s, with  the principal protagonists including the MPLA, founded in 1956, the National Front for the Liberation of Angola (FNLA), which appeared in 1961, and the UNITA, founded in 1966. After many years of conflict that weakened all of the insurgent parties, Angola gained independence on 11 November 1975, after the Carnation Revolution in Portugal, which overthrew the Portuguese regime headed by Marcelo Caetano.

A fight for dominance broke out immediately between the three nationalist movements. The events prompted a mass exodus of Portuguese citizens, creating up to 300,000 destitute Portuguese refugees—the retornados. The new Portuguese government attempted to mediate an understanding between the three competing movements, which they initially agreed to, but later failed and resulted in a devastating civil war which lasted several decades, claiming millions of lives and producing many refugees until ending in 2002.

During the civil war, the MPLA gained control of the capital Luanda and much of the rest of the country. With the support of the United States, Zaire and South Africa intervened militarily in favour of the FNLA and UNITA, with the intention of taking Luanda before the declaration of independence. In response, Cuba intervened in favour of the MPLA, which became a flash point for the Cold War. With Cuban support, the MPLA held Luanda and declared independence on 11 November 1975, with Agostinho Neto becoming the first president, though the civil war continued. Jose Eduardo dos Santos won the 1980 and 1986 elections and became the first elected President of the country. The civil war continued with UNITA fighting against the MLPA, with both parties receiving international support. There was a ceasefire agreement during 1989, with the leader of UNITA, Jonas Savimbi, but it collapsed soon afterwards. As a part of its peace efforts, the MLPA dropped its theme of Marxism–Leninism and moved to socialism. During May 1991, Dos Sambos and Savimbi signed a multiparty democracy agreement in Lisbon.

Conduct
Voter registration was carried out between 20 May and 31 July and the National Electoral Council enrolled a total of 4,828,468 eligible voters. Campaigning was intense from two of the major parties; UNITA campaigned against the colonial influence of Portugal and proposed a native setup. The elections were monitored by 800 representatives of the UN Angola Verification Mission (UNAVEM).

Results
Voter turnout was around 75 per cent voter, with the UN airlifting people in remote areas to the polling stations. Early counting indicated that MPLA was leading in most constituencies; UNITA immediately rejected the result and pulled out its forces out of the combined troops of the army and started preparing for a war. The National Electoral Council delayed announcing the results beyond the eight-day limit prescribed and announced the results on 17 October 1992.

President

National Assembly
A total of 12 parties won seats, with the ruling MPLA winning nearly 54% of the total votes and 129 of the 220 seats, whilst UNITA won 70 seats. The first multi-party parliament session was convened on 26 October 1992 with all members of UNITA abstaining.

By province

Aftermath
The ruling MPLA won both elections, but the eight opposition parties, in particular UNITA, rejected the results as rigged. An official observer wrote that there was little UN supervision, that 500,000 UNITA voters were disenfranchised and that there were 100 clandestine polling stations. UNITA sent negotiators to the capital, but at the same time prepared measures to resume the civil war. As a consequence, hostilities erupted in Luanda and immediately spread to other parts of the country. Several thousand to tens of thousands of UNITA members or supporters were killed nationwide by MPLA forces in a few days, in what is known as the Halloween Massacre. War resumed immediately.

According to the constitution adopted in 1992, since dos Santos failed to win 50 percent of the vote, he would have faced Savimbi in a runoff election. However, Savimbi refused to take part in the runoff, saying the election had neither been free nor fair. Due to the resumption of the Civil War, the second round never took place, and dos Santos continued as President, even without the constitutionally-necessary democratic legitimisation. Dos Santos assumed office for the third continuous term as President on 2 December 1992 and appointed Marcolino Moco as the new Prime Minister of Angola. Most of the ministries were given to MPLA, while UNITA was offered six portfolios, which was accepted only later. There were four other portfolios allocated to other parties.

References

Elections in Angola
Angola
1992 in Angola
Angola